Molecular Endocrinology is a peer-reviewed journal that publishes research on the molecular processes of hormones.

References 

Publications established in 1987
Molecular and cellular biology journals
English-language journals
Monthly journals